The MA-2 bomber jacket (also known as the MA-2 flight jacket or CWU-45 flight jacket) is an advanced version derived of the original MA-1 bomber jacket that was originally designed for the American military during the 1950s. CWU stands for "Cold Weather Uniform."

The term MA-2 was a trademark of the Cobles Clothing Company, adopted in the late 1980s when the CWU-45 military jacket started to gain popularity in street fashion. The term MA-2 has become so popular it is now used interchangeably with CWU-45 to represent this type of jacket.

There is also a lightweight version of this jacket, referred to as CWU-36.

Design
The MA-2 has several design changes compared to an MA-1;
 Large cargo pockets sewn onto the front of the jacket rather than the small slash pockets on the MA-1 Jackets.
 A fold-down collar rather than the elasticated collar of the MA-1
 Usually not orange lining, usually the same colour as the outer nylon
 A different design where the sleeves join the back to allow easier movement
 The cut is somewhat shorter - the jacket sits high on the waist compared to the MA-1.
 Genuine, military-issue CWU-45 and CWU-36 jackets (not the commercially available copies) are mostly made from the flame-resistant fabric Nomex, rather than the flammable fabrics used in earlier jackets.
 Genuine, military-issue Nomex CWU-45 and CWU-36 jackets have slightly larger and higher pocket openings.

See also
 MA-1 bomber jacket
 Bomber jacket
 Blouson

References

Jackets
United States military uniforms
Aircrew clothing
United States Air Force uniforms
Military equipment introduced in the 1950s